Nathan S. Netanyahu (born 28 November 1951) is an Israeli computer scientist, a professor of computer science at Bar-Ilan University.

Netanyahu is the son of mathematician Elisha Netanyahu and Supreme Court of Israel justice Shoshana Netanyahu, the nephew of historian Benzion Netanyahu, and the cousin of current Prime Minister of Israel Benjamin Netanyahu. He did his graduate studies at the University of Maryland, College Park, earning a Ph.D. in 1992 under the supervision of David Mount and Azriel Rosenfeld.

Netanyahu has co-authored highly cited research papers on nearest neighbor search and
k-means clustering. He has published many papers on computer chess, was the local organizer of the 12th World Computer Chess Championship in 2004, and was program co-chair for the 4th International Conference on Computers and Games, colocated with the WCCC. Another frequent topic in his research is image registration.

References

External links
Publications on DBLP

1951 births
Israeli computer scientists
Israeli people of Polish-Jewish descent
Researchers in geometric algorithms
Academic staff of Bar-Ilan University
University of Maryland, College Park alumni
Technion – Israel Institute of Technology alumni
Living people
Netanyahu family